İrfan Can Kahveci (born 15 July 1995) is a Turkish professional footballer who plays as a central midfielder for Süper Lig club Fenerbahçe and the Turkey national team.

Club career

Gençlerbirliği
After playing in the youth squad for Gençlerbirliği, Irfan Can made his debut for the first team during the 2014–15 season. On 9 November 2014, he scored his first league goal in the 63rd minute against Kasımpaşa. He finished the season with 6 goals in 30 matches in league and cup competitions.

In his second season with Gençlerbirliği he amassed 3 goals in 33 matches in all competitions.

İstanbul Başakşehir
On 26 December 2016, Kahveci signed a 4.5-year contract with İstanbul Başakşehir. On 2 December 2020, he scored a hat-trick against RB Leipzig in the UEFA Champions League. His team, however, lost the match 3–4. It made him only the third player to score a hat-trick in a losing cause in the Champions League, after Ronaldo and Gareth Bale.

Fenerbahçe
On 31 January 2021, Fenerbahçe announced via Twitter that Kahveci joined the team. He signed a four-and-a-half-year contract with Fenerbahçe for a €7 million fee.

International career
Kahveci was called up by manager Fatih Terim for Turkey's friendly match against Russia on 31 August 2016 and subsequent World Cup 2018 qualifier against Croatia. He made a debut in the national team on 23 March 2018 in a 1–0 win against Ireland. In his second match in June 2019, a friendly against Uzbekistan, he had a chance to score his first international goal, but he missed a 90th minute penalty kick. Turkey still won the game 2–0 courtesy of a brace from Zeki Çelik.

Career statistics

Club

International

Scores and results list Turkey's goal tally first.

Honours
İstanbul Başakşehir
Süper Lig: 2019–20

References

External links
 Profile at TFF
 

1995 births
Living people
People from Ayaş, Ankara
Footballers from Ankara
Association football forwards
Turkish footballers
Turkey international footballers
Turkey youth international footballers
Turkey under-21 international footballers
Süper Lig players
Gençlerbirliği S.K. footballers
Hacettepe S.K. footballers
İstanbul Başakşehir F.K. players
Fenerbahçe S.K. footballers
UEFA Euro 2020 players